Notelaea punctata, also known as the large mock-olive, is a species of flowering plant in the olive family that is native to eastern Queensland, Australia.

References

punctata
Flora of Queensland
Lamiales of Australia
Taxa named by Robert Brown (botanist, born 1773)
Plants described in 1810